Copyright rightsholder may refer to:

 Copyright collective
 Trade association#Copyright trade groups